4shbab (or , "For the Youth") was an Arabic-language satellite television station headquartered in Cairo, Egypt and broadcast out of Bahrain. The station refers to itself as "Islam's own MTV". and it seeks to "provide superior art form and content... to balance conservation and rehabilitation of young people... [and] the promotion of moral and religious values."  Dr. Ali Al'omari serves as the Chairman of the station, and Ahmed Abu Haiba is the founder and Executive Director of 4Shbab.

According to a 2009 Associated Press article, the founder of the channel, Ahmed Abu Haiba, said that he opened the station to show that Muslims can be in touch with the contemporary world. One of the programs is Soutak Wasel ("Your Voice is Heard"), nicknamed "Islamic Idol" by Abu Haiba, a program similar to American Idol. Soutak Wasel features all male performers and an audience separated by gender.

The channel's website is no longer functioning.

References

External links

 The Arab Music Channel 4Shbab: Music for the Young That Is Pleasing to God
 Cosmopolitan Islamism and its Critics: An Article About 4Shbab and Ahmed Abu Haiba in Arab Media and Society

2009 establishments in Egypt
Television channels and stations established in 2009
Television stations in Egypt
Arabic-language television stations
Islamic television networks
Mass media in Cairo